Irving Kaplan may refer to:
 Irving Kaplan (government official), official of the United States government, accused of involvement in Soviet espionage
 Irving Kaplan (chemist), American chemist
 Irving D. Kaplan, American radiation oncologist